Richard Paget may refer to:
 Sir Richard Paget, 1st Baronet, British politician
 Sir Richard Paget, 2nd Baronet, British barrister and amateur scientific investigator